Molkom is a locality situated in Karlstad Municipality, Värmland County, Sweden with 1,863 inhabitants in 2010.

External links 
Mera Molkom

References 

Populated places in Värmland County
Populated places in Karlstad Municipality